Blades is the surname of:

 Ben C. Blades (1908–1973), American politician
 Cameron Blades (born 1971), Australian rugby union player
 Daniel Blades, Lord Blades (1888–1959), Scottish judge
 Jack Blades (born 1954), American musician
 Jay Blades (born 1970), British furniture restorer and presenter
 Mona Blades, 18-year-old New Zealand woman who disappeared in 1975
 Rubén Blades (born 1948), Panamanian singer

See also
 Richard Blade (born 1952), radio, television, and film personality

Occupational surnames